Steve Seskin is an American singer, songwriter, and musician whose songs have been recorded by recording artists Garth Brooks, Reba McEntire, Waylon Jennings, Tim McGraw, Colin Raye, and Mark Wills among others. The debut single from McGraw's Set This Circus Down, "Grown Men Don't Cry", was nominated for a 2002 Grammy award and also garnered the No. 1 position on the Billboard Country Single Chart in June 2001. Seskin also is known for performing at schools in support of the Operation Respect/Don't Laugh at Me project, named after "Don't Laugh at Me," a song he wrote with Allen Shamblin that was recorded by Mark Wills and Peter, Paul and Mary, among others.

Seskin splits his time between touring, Nashville and Northern California.

Early life
Steve Seskin was born (March 31, 1952) in The Bronx, New York to parents Zelda (née Wein) and Irving Seskin. 
Seskin began playing guitar at 14 years old and started writing songs shortly after.  He moved to San Francisco in 1971 and began his music career as a street performer progressing to festivals and clubs. There he met Ellen Seskin. They were married in 1981 and have one son, David.

After opening a concert for Crystal Gayle, she suggested that Seskin should go to Nashville to pursue songwriting, which he did. During his first visit there in 1985, Seskin began with only one appointment with an ASCAP executive who subsequently arranged Seskin's appointments with several publishers.

Music career

Selected Discography

Grown Men Don't Cry
"Grown Men Don't Cry", written by Tom Douglas and Steve Seskin was recorded by American country music artist Tim McGraw. It was released in April 2001 as the first single from McGraw's 2001 album Set This Circus Down. The song reached number one on the US Billboard Hot Country Singles & Tracks (now Hot Country Songs) chart and peaked at number 25 on the Billboard Hot 100

"Grown Men Don't Cry" debuted at number 30 on the U.S. Billboard Hot Country Singles & Tracks for the chart week of March 24, 2001.

Don't Laugh at Me
"Don't Laugh at Me", written by Allen Shamblin and Steve Seskin, was recorded by American country music artist Mark Wills.  It was released in July 1998 as the second single from album Wish You Were Here.  "Don't Laugh at Me" was a number 2 hit on the Billboard country charts. The song received Country Music Association nominations for Country Music Association's Single, Song and Video of the Year in 1998.

"Don't Laugh at Me" debuted at number 69 on the U.S. Billboard Hot Country Singles & Tracks for the week of July 18, 1998. The song peaked at number 2 on the Hot Country Songs chart on October 10, 1998.

Books
Sing My Song Book & CD - A Kid's Guide to Songwriting - 2008
A Chance to Shine Book & CD - 2006

Don't Laugh at Me Book & CD - 2002
Songwriting and the Guitar - 2000

Teaching
Seskin teaches songwriting workshops throughout the U.S. as well as teaching songwriting courses at San Francisco State University, The Kerrville Folk Festival Songwriting School and The Rocky Mountain Folk Festival.  He has played an active role as a songwriting teacher and mentor at West Coast Songwriters Association since 1988 and Nashville Songwriters Association International since 1995.

Operation Respect Don't Laugh at Me
Seskin is the co-writer of “Don’t Laugh At Me”, the song that was the impetus for the Operation Respect program and organization, co-founded by Peter Yarrow.

Operation Respect, a non-profit education and advocacy organization dedicated to advancing the social and emotional growth of children and youth, was founded in 1999 by Peter Yarrow of the folk trio Peter, Paul and Mary, and Dr. Charlotte Frank. Operation Respect was first inspired by a moment between father and daughter (Bethany Yarrow), a singer and activist who told her dad that he had to hear a song called Don’t Laugh at Me. She believed that it was exactly the kind of movement creating music Peter, Paul and Mary stood for. Written by Steve Seskin, now an Operation Respect Board Member, and Allen Shamblin, the lyrics of Don’t Laugh at Me is Operation Respect's theme song and classroom-based curricula. Since its inception, their speakers and performers have addressed over 500,000 educators, educational leaders, parents, students, policy makers and community members throughout the world.

Kids Write Songs
Seskin is the founder of Kids Write Songs, a songwriting workshop teaching creative expression to children of all ages as well as teaching them to create their own songs that address issues that affect bullying, respect, peer pressure, diversity, and self-esteem. Workshops consist of 3 to 4 sessions with about 30 students each session.

The Parkland Project - Wake Up America
The Parkland Project, a youth-inspired songwriting initiative, released original songs at the National Association for Music Education National Conference. The tracks tell of the surviving students’ deep trauma from the shooting at Marjory Stoneman Douglas High School on Valentine's Day, Feb 14, 2018 and reflect a commitment to the student-led movements dedicated to stopping the killing of their classmates and peers, and the passing of gun laws to do so.

Written and composed by the students of Parkland, Florida, with the guidance of noted songwriters such as Steve Seskin and Peter Yarrow and music producers affiliated with Operation Respect, the album, Wake Up, America, its title track, followed by compositions, Song for the Silenced, Transparent, Valentine’s Day, Change the Ref, We Got the Power, Armor Off, Watering Can Full of Tears, The Children Will Lead the Way, and We Need was released. Proceeds from the songs benefit Shine MSD and Change the Ref, Parkland-based organizations providing art-based trauma informed therapy and advocates of gun-violence prevention.

Sources
http://www.taxi.com/transmitter/0305/headlineC0305.html

References

External links
www.steveseskin.com – Official website
 – Operation Respect/Don't Laugh at Me project
 – All Music
 - Kids Write Songs

American country songwriters
American male songwriters
Living people
1952 births